Denfield Roosevelt McNab (born 4 May 1943) is a former Belizean cyclist. He competed in the individual pursuit at the 1968 Summer Olympics.

References

1943 births
Living people
People from Punta Gorda
Belizean male cyclists
Commonwealth Games competitors for British Honduras
Cyclists at the 1966 British Empire and Commonwealth Games
Olympic cyclists of British Honduras
Cyclists at the 1968 Summer Olympics